The Women's road race of the 2018 UCI Road World Championships was a cycling event that took place on 29 September 2018 in Innsbruck, Austria. It was the 58th edition of the event, for which Dutch rider Chantal Blaak was the defending champion, having won in 2017. 149 riders from 48 nations entered the competition.

Blaak surrendered the title to her teammate Anna van der Breggen, the reigning Olympic champion, after attacking on the penultimate ascent of the Aldrans–Lans–Igls climb. Having caught the erstwhile leaders a few kilometres later, van der Breggen soloed away from them not long after. Van der Breggen extended her advantage over the remaining  and continued on to her first world championship title with a winning margin of three minutes and forty-two seconds. Australia's Amanda Spratt managed to remain clear from the breakaway to take Australia's second consecutive silver medal, while Italy's Tatiana Guderzo – the 2009 world champion – completed the podium, attacking on the final lap from a small group; she finished almost five-and-a-half minutes in arrears of van der Breggen.

Course
After , the riders crossed the finish line for the first time, before starting three laps of a circuit  in length. After a short period of flat roads, the race descended through Igls back towards Innsbruck and the finish line in front of the Tyrolean State Theatre.

Qualification
Qualification was based mainly on the UCI World Ranking by nations as of 12 August 2018. The first five nations in this classification qualified seven riders to start, the next ten nations qualified six riders to start and the next five nations qualified five riders to start. All other nations had the possibility to send three riders to start. In addition to this number, the outgoing World Champion and the current continental champions (for both elite and under-23 riders) were also able to take part.

Continental champions

UCI World Ranking by Nations
Rankings as at 12 August 2018.

Participating nations
149 cyclists from 48 nations were entered in the women's road race. The number of cyclists per nation is shown in parentheses.

Final classification

References

External links
Road race page at Innsbruck-Tirol 2018 website

Women's road race
UCI Road World Championships – Women's road race
2018 in women's road cycling